The 2006 United States House of Representatives Elections in Florida took place on November 7, 2006. Elections were held in Florida's 1st through 25th congressional districts.

Florida is known to be a moderate-to-conservative state, with more liberals residing in South Florida, and moderates and conservatives dominating both the northern and central regions of Florida, as well as a strong Republican base in Cuban-American portions of Miami. A former Florida Secretary of State made famous in the 2000 presidential election challenged incumbent Senator Bill Nelson, and ended up losing to Nelson. Democrats set their sights on two districts in the Sarasota and Tampa area (the open seats of both Harris and the retiring Mike Bilirakis, respectively), and also on a South Florida district held by one of the Sunshine State's longest-serving congressmen. The primary was held on September 5, 2006. The popularity of outgoing Governor Jeb Bush aided their gubernatorial candidate, Attorney General Charlie Crist and helped Republicans win downballot, including Crist's newly elected successor at the Attorney General position, former Rep. Bill McCollum.

The following Representatives went unopposed in the 2006 election and thus their election is not reported below:
Allen Boyd (D-FL-02)
Corrine Brown (D-FL-03)
Robert Wexler (D-FL-19)
Debbie Wasserman Schultz (D-FL-20)
Alcee Hastings (D-FL-23)

Overview

District 1

Three-term incumbent Republican Congressman Jeff Miller had an easy time seeking re-election in this staunchly conservative district based in the Florida Panhandle. Miller, who was initially elected in a special election in 2001 to replace Joe Scarborough, took advantage of this district's large military population based around the Naval Air Station Pensacola with his membership on the House Veterans Affairs Committee and the naturally conservative tendencies of western Florida to easily defeat Democratic challenger Joe Roberts.

District 4

Incumbent Republican Congressman Ander Crenshaw represented this North Florida and Jacksonville-based district since 2001.Crenshaw was re-elected with nearly 70% of the vote.

District 5

Incumbent Republican Congressman Ginny Brown-Waite faced challenger John Russell. She was re-elected to a third term with nearly 60% of the vote.

District 6

Encompassing North Central Florida, this conservative district is represented by nine-term incumbent Republican Congressman Cliff Stearns. Stearns, seeking a tenth term, faced off against Democratic candidate David Bruderly. Though Stearns defeated Bruderly by a wide margin, it was not the margin of victory that Stearns is used to in this gerrymandered district.

District 7

Incumbent Republican Congressman John Mica, initially elected in 1992, sought his eighth term in this conservative district that stretches along the coast of Florida from St. Augustine to Daytona Beach and peeks into the Orlando Metropolitan Area. Mica defeated Democratic candidate John Chagnon in a landslide.

District 8

Republican Congressman Ric Keller, seeking a fourth term in this moderately conservative, Central Florida-based district, faced off against businessman Charlie Stuart, a moderate Democrat. Though Keller held onto his seat in the midst of a Democratic wave that was sweeping the country, he won by only a few points.

Democratic primary
 Charlie Stuart, businessman
 Alan Grayson, war contractor attorney
 Homer Hartage, Orange County Commissioner

Republican primary 
Ric Keller, incumbent U.S. Congressman
Elizabeth Doran, businesswoman

General election 
Incumbent Republican Congressman Ric Keller, best known for his Cheeseburger Bill, which prevented customers from suing fast food chains for health problems, decided to seek a fourth term in Congress. Charlie Stuart, a marketing consultant, an Orange County, Florida native and member of a prominent Orlando family, was nominated by the Democratic Party to face Keller. Stuart was touted by the Democratic Congressional Campaign Committee as a top longshot candidate and received the backing of local figures such as Congressman Allen Boyd, ex-Orlando mayors Glenda Hood and Bill Frederick and present Orlando mayor Buddy Dyer, as well as national ones such as former Virginia Governor Mark Warner.

District 9

After serving twelve terms in the United States Congress, Republican incumbent Congressman Michael Bilirakis declined to run for re-election. His son, Gus Bilirakis, a member of the Florida House of Representatives emerged as the Republican nominee and squared off against Phyllis Busansky, the Democratic nominee and a former Hillsborough County Commissioner. The district has a tilt towards electing Republicans, so Busansky's campaign was not given much of a chance at first. As the campaign progressed, however, it received national attention from the Democratic Congressional Campaign Committee. Though Bilirakis defeated Busansky by a ten-point margin, Busansky's performance was a large improvement over past years and outperformed her expected performance in the polls.

District 10

In this district, which is the only congressional district in the state to lie exclusively in one county, has been represented by incumbent Republican Congressman Bill Young for several decades. A former Chairman of the House Appropriations Committee, Young has been overwhelmingly re-elected year after year. In 2006, despite the moderate nature of his district and the acidic environment for Republicans nationwide, Congressman Young swamped Democratic nominee Samm Simpson.

District 11

Rather than seek a sixth term in this liberal district based in Tampa, incumbent Democratic Congressman Jim Davis opted to run for Governor, creating an open seat. Hillsborough County Commissioner Kathy Castor, the daughter of renowned Florida politician Betty Castor, ran for the seat and won the Democratic nomination, defeating Florida State Senate Minority Leader Les Miller. She faced Republican candidate Eddie Adams, an architect, in the general election, which she won by a convincing margin.

District 12

Incumbent Republican Congressman Adam Putnam, a member of the Republican leadership in the House, sought and easily won a fourth term in Congress, defeating independent candidates Joe Viscusi and Ed Bowlin.

District 13

Two-term incumbent Republican Congresswoman Katherine Harris opted to run for Senate rather than seek a third term, creating an open seat. The 13th district, based in Southwest Florida, is fairly conservative, but a competitive race emerged between the Republican nominee, car dealership owner Vern Buchanan, and the Democratic nominee, banking executive Christine Jennings. Though Buchanan appeared to be victorious on election day by a 350-vote margin, Jennings requested a recount. Though the recount did not change the outcome of the race, Jennings filed additional complaints due to the fact that 13% of Sarasota County residents did not vote in the Congressional election, an unusually high number and the fact that the touch-screen machines did not provide a paper trail.

Believing the matter to be unsettled, Jennings sued to challenge the results of the election in court, noting the "pervasive malfunctioning of electronic voting machines." A Florida circuit judge rejected her lawsuit in December 2006, ruling that her allegations of lost votes in Sarasota County were "conjecture." Jennings met further failure in June 2007, when a Florida state appellate court ruled that Jennings did not meet the "extraordinary burden" of proving the lower court judge was wrong.

Though Jennings fought the results further by appealing directly to the United States House of Representatives, this action, too, caused her to walk away empty-handed. After a three-person House task force was created to evaluate the election, the task force voted along party lines to refer an investigation into Florida's 13th district House race to the Government Accountability Office (GAO).

In February 2008, the committee and the House accepted the findings of the GAO that no machine error affected the outcome of the election, going a step further to pass HR 989, which affirmed the findings of the committee, accepted the results of the 2006 race and formally dismissed Jennings' challenge of the election's results. Jennings formally dropped her challenge shortly thereafter to focus on her 2008 rematch against Buchanan.

District 14

After winning his first Congressional election in 2004 to replace Porter Goss, incumbent Republican Congressman Connie Mack IV sought a second term in 2006. Mack's district, based in the Gulf Coast region of Florida, is solidly conservative and overwhelmingly gave the Congressman a second term over Democratic candidate Robert Neeld.

District 15

In this Space Coast-based district, incumbent Republican Congressman Dave Weldon sought election to a seventh term in Congress. This district, though undoubtedly conservative, gave Weldon a smaller margin of victory over Democratic nominee Robert Bowman in 2006 than in previous years, likely due to the anti-Republican sentiment nationwide.

District 16

Incumbent Republican Congressman Mark Foley was considered to be a shoo-in for re-election until the House page scandal involving Foley became public knowledge. The Congressman resigned on September 29, 2006, thus cancelling his re-election bid. The Republican Party of Florida selected Florida State Representative Joe Negron to replace Foley, though Foley's name remained on the ballot. Though Negron launched a successful campaign to urge voters to "Punch Foley for Joe!", indicating that voters should "punch" Foley's name on the ballot to vote for Negron, he was ultimately unsuccessful on election day and fell to Democratic nominee and businessman Tim Mahoney.

One poll taken by Hamilton Beattie on September 12, 2006, had Foley leading Tim Mahoney in a matchup by 48% for Foley to 35% for Mahoney .

According to the state of Florida, 42% of the voters in this district are registered Republicans, and 36% are registered Democrats. George W. Bush won this district with 52% of the vote in the 2000 presidential election, and with 54% of the vote in the 2004 presidential election.

Mahoney has sharply criticized the Bush administration for overspending, general mismanagement, and its policies in Iraq. In August, General Wesley Clark endorsed the candidacy of Mahoney for Congress.

On September 28, 2006, ABC News reported that Republican incumbent Mark Foley had sent email messages, from his personal AOL account, to a then-16-year-old former Congressional page, asking the page to send a photo of himself to Foley, among other things that were overtly sexual in nature.

Mahoney has called for a full investigation of Foley's actions. The next day Foley submitted a letter of resignation from Congress on September 29, 2006 in the wake of news reports about the communications.

Republicans' hold on Mark Foley's seat went "from safe to shaky overnight." On October 2, 2006, the Florida Republican Party Executive Board selected state representative Joe Negron as Mahoney's new opponent. However, Negron's name did not appear on the ballot so he only received votes cast for Foley, whose name remained on the ballot by law.

On election day Mahoney narrowly defeated Negron by 1.8 percentage points. While Negron carried most of the more conservative areas of the district near Fort Myers, Mahoney carried the two largest counties in the district, Palm Beach and St. Lucie counties, by a combined margin of over 10,000 votes — far more than the actual margin of victory.

He was the first Democrat to represent the district since its creation in 1973 (it was the 10th District until 1983 and the 12th District until 1993).

District 17

This majority African-American district based in southern Broward County and eastern Miami-Dade County has a very strong Democratic tilt and has been represented by Congressman Kendrick Meek since his initial election in 2002 and was previously represented by Meek's mother, Carrie Meek, for ten years. Meek was overwhelmingly elected to a third term with no Republican or independent challenger.

District 18

Incumbent Republican Congresswoman Ileana Ros-Lehtinen, a respected member of the House Foreign Affairs Committee, represents a marginally conservative district that encompasses much of Miami, the southern suburbs of Miami, and the entire Florida Keys. Seeking a tenth term in Congress, Ros-Lehtinen easily defeated Democratic nominee Dave Patlak in the general election.

District 21

Incumbent Republican Congressman Lincoln Diaz-Balart decided to run for an eighth term in Congress in this district composed of the western suburbs of Miami. Conservative due to the large presence of Cuban-Americans here, this district is a Hispanic-American majority district and has regularly sent Congressman Diaz-Balart back to Washington with solid victories. 2006 proved to be no different, and Diaz-Balart defeated Frank Gonzalez, though by a thinner margin than is usually achieved in this district.

District 22

This district, which stretches from northern Broward County to northern Palm Beach County, marginally leads towards the Democratic side, but incumbent Republican Congressman Clay Shaw's pragmatic and moderate profile in Congress enabled him to continually be re-elected. This year, however, Shaw faced difficulty in his bid for a fourteenth term. Florida State Senator Ron Klein, previously the Democratic leader in the Senate, ultimately defeated Shaw in the general election by a thin three-point margin.

District 24

Incumbent Republican Congressman Tom Feeney, initially elected in 2002 and re-elected unopposed in 2004 in this hand-crafted, gerrymandered district, hardly faced a challenge from Democratic candidate Clint Curtis. Feeney, however, was marred by allegations of corruption brought about by Curtis, a computer programmer who claimed that Feeney asked Curtis to create a software to "steal" votes using touch-screen voting machines. Feeney treated Curtis like a gadfly, sending out mailers featuring Curtis with a tin-foil hat and refusing to debate him. Polling, however, indicated that the race was tight, with a Zogby poll showing Feeney at a 45% level of support and Curtis attaining 43%. Ultimately, though, on election day, Feeney swamped Curtis, winning all four counties in the district. The surprisingly close race, however, indicated that Feeney could be brought down with a serious challenger.

District 25

This district, with a Hispanic-American majority and based in South Florida, has the tendency to support Republican candidates. Incumbent Republican Congressman Mario Diaz-Balart has represented the district since its creation in 2003 and had not faced a close call so far in his career. In 2006, however, though Diaz-Balart defeated Democratic opponent Michael Calderin by a solid margin, it was a thinner margin than usual.

References

See also
 2006 Florida state elections
 2006 United States House of Representatives elections

2006
Florida
United States House of Representatives